Patrice Aouissi (born 24 February 1966) is a French former professional boxer who competed from 1990 to 2000, challenging for the WBC cruiserweight title in 1996. As an amateur, he competed in the men's light heavyweight event at the 1992 Summer Olympics.

References

External links
 
 

1966 births
Living people
French male boxers
Olympic boxers of France
Boxers at the 1992 Summer Olympics
Sportspeople from Lyon
Cruiserweight boxers
Light-heavyweight boxers
20th-century French people